Diane Brown (born ) is an American curler and curling coach.

Mixed

Record as a coach of national teams

Personal life
Brown is from a family of well-known American curlers. Diane's husband Steve Brown is also a curler and coach, as well as three-time US men's champion and Worlds bronze medalist. Together they won the US Mixed championship in 1984. Their children, Craig Brown and Erika Brown, are also US champions and World medalists.

Brown is co-founder and co-owner of Steve's Curling Supplies, a curling equipment company.

References

External links 

1946 births
Living people
American female curlers
American curling champions
American curling coaches
21st-century American women